Dygowo  is a village in Kołobrzeg County, West Pomeranian Voivodeship, in north-western Poland. It is the seat of the gmina (administrative district) called Gmina Dygowo.

The village has a population of 1,549.

References

Villages in Kołobrzeg County